Kohlberg is a surname. Notable people with the surname include:

 Alfred Kohlberg (1887–1960), American businessman and anti-communist
 Andy Kohlberg (born 1959), American tennis player
 Benny Kohlberg (born 1954), Swedish cross-country skier
 Jerome Kohlberg, Jr., (1925-2015), American financier
 Lawrence Kohlberg, (1927–1987) developmental psychologist
 Olga Bernstein Kohlberg (1864–1935), German-American philanthropist
 Yaron Kohlberg (born 1983), Israeli pianist

German-language surnames
Jewish surnames